Shi Gandang is a Chinese god and the protector of the home. He was originally a spirit sent down from Mount Tai by Bixia Yuanjun to protect ordinary people from evil spirits.

As part of cultural tradition, there will also often be Taishan Shi Gandang stones set up near buildings and other places, in order to protect those places from evil spirits. These are not to be confused with spirit tablets.

Legend
A very strong and brave woodcutter named Shi Gandang lived on Mount Tai. He was taught martial arts and magic by an old Taoist. One day a demon came to the rich man Wang Yuanwai's house and put his daughter into a coma. Many Taoists used charms and incantations to exorcize the demon but to no avail. Wang Yuanwai sent out a bulletin to be posted all around the region. Wang offered half his family's wealth as a reward. In addition, if the person who saved his daughter was a young, unmarried man, he could marry the daughter. Shi Gandang saw the notice and decided to give it a try. Shi asked Wang to prepare a magic sword and a set of tight-fitting clothes, while he wrote out a charm. He pasted the charm over the door to the daughter's room.  At dusk Shi put on the clothes, and grasping the sword, he went into the daughter's room. At the third watch, there was a fierce wind, and the demon arrived. He laughingly tore down the charm and burst into the room. Shi yelled out "What demon dares to enter? Taishan Shi Gandang is here!" The demon turned and fled back to his cave. Wang gave half of his wealth to Shi. Shi and Miss Wang were married, and Shi moved into the Wang household.

The demon was so frightened he dared not leave his cave for over a month. Eventually, he ventured out again and cast a spell over someone in another village. The villagers heard of Shi Gandang and sent someone to ask him to come. Shi set off to the village. Before Shi arrived, the demon heard of his coming and fled. The villagers were elated. But soon the demon appeared in another village. Shi went there, scared off the demon, but then the demon went elsewhere.  This went on for a year. Shi returned home for the New Year's. His wife asked how he was doing, and he explained. She suggested a means of avoiding all his running around. "Why doesn't every village put up an inscription with your name? When the goblin sees the plaque, it won't dare enter the village." This idea worked, and word soon spread until all villages had a stone inscription with the five characters "Taishan Shi Gandang". By learning martial arts and magic within the sacred precincts of Mount Tai, Shi Gandang gains an advantage over other Taoists, who fail to control the goblin. The God of Mount Tai's role as a judge or king in the underworld gives him control over creatures such as the demon in the story. Thus, Shi Gandang, drawing on the God of Mount Tai's authority in the underworld, can quell the demon.

See also 
 Shigandang

References 

Chinese deities
Chinese gods